Yelyzaveta Azza (born 12 February 2005) is a Ukrainian rhythmic gymnast, member of the senior group.

Career 
In 2022, after part of the previous team retired after the 2020 Olympics, Yelyzaveta was incorporated into the national senior group. After a rough start because of the invasion of Ukraine, they debuted at the World Cup in Pesaro being 11th in the All-Around and 6th with 3 ribbons and 2 balls. In June she competed in Tel Aviv at the European Championships, taking 10th place in the All-Around and 6th with 5 hoops. She also participated in the World Championships in Sofia along Nikol Krasiuk, Diana Baieva, Daryna Duda, Anastasiya Voznyak, Oleksandra Yushchak and the individuals Viktoriia Onopriienko, Polina Karika and Polina Horodnycha, finishing 12th in the All-Around and with 5 hoops as well as 11th with 3 ribbons and 2 balls.

References 

2005 births
Living people
Ukrainian rhythmic gymnasts
People from Kropyvnytskyi